William Pitts II (1790–1840) was an English silver-chaser and sculptor.

Life
He was son of William Pitts I (c.1755 – after 1806), a silver-chaser to whom he was apprenticed in 1806, and his wife Mary Armitage.  In 1812 he obtained the gold Isis medal from the Society of Arts for modelling.  He was a draughtsman, and also tried painting; ambidextrous, he drew and modelled with either hand.

Pitts gained a reputation for models and reliefs in neo-classical taste.  A versatile artist, he made designs for plates and other domestic items. He also worked for Rundell & Bridge as a chaser.  He ran into business and financial troubles, and committed suicide on 16 April 1840 by taking laudanum at his residence, 5 Watkins Terrace, Pimlico.

Works
Pitts chased a portion of the "Wellington Shield" designed by Thomas Stothard for Green & Ward, and the whole of the "Shield of Achilles" designed by John Flaxman for Rundell & Bridge. In later life he modelled, in imitation of those, a "Shield of Æneas" and "Shield of Hercules" from Hesiod only a portion of the former was carried out in silver. Pitts had a very prolific imagination, and  In 1830 he executed the bas-reliefs in the bow-room and drawing-rooms at Buckingham Palace. He exhibited models at the Royal Academy, and made two designs for the Nelson monument.

He executed for publication a series of outline illustrations to the works of Virgil, of which two numbers were published, and also a series of illustrations to Ossian, of which two were engraved in mezzotint, but never published. He made similar drawings to illustrate Horace and the Bacchæ and Ion of Euripides.

Family
Pitts married at the age of nineteen, and left at least five children, of whom the third son Joseph Pitts II  (baptised 1821, died  1880) was known as a sculptor. In 1846 Joseph executed a bust of George Stephenson that is in the National Portrait Gallery, London.

Notes

Attribution

1790 births
1840 deaths
English silversmiths
English sculptors
English male sculptors
Draughtsmen
Suicides by poison
1840s suicides